Britta Hasso (1936 – 14 February 2015) (also known as Britta Callmér-Hartnagel) was a Swedish actress and journalist.  She was mostly known for writing articles about school and pedagogic topics.
Hasso studied to become an actress at Kalle Flygare's theatre school in Stockholm, Sweden, in the 1950s and shortly after she started her career she met Harry Hasso (also known as Karl Hartnagel) the Swedish/German film director and camera man whom she married in 1961. They remained married until his death in 1984. 
She started to work as a journalist at Helsingborgs Dagblad in Helsingborg, Sweden in 1966 and worked there until she retired in 1998. She died at age 79 on Valentine's Day 2015.

References

1936 births
Swedish journalists
2015 deaths
Swedish women journalists
20th-century Swedish women writers
21st-century Swedish women writers
20th-century Swedish actresses
21st-century Swedish actresses
Date of birth missing